Ficus nymphaeifolia is a strangler fig found in central and South America. Growing up to 35 metres tall, the habitat is coastal plains, savannah and rainforest. This plant first appeared in scientific literature in 1768. Published in The Gardeners Dictionary by the English botanist, Philip Miller from specimens collected in the Caribbean. Latex from the plant may be used in the form of a plaster, to treat sprains and fractures and cuts to the body, to offer relief from pain and to protect a wound from infection.

References 

nymphaeifolia
Trees of South America
Flora of Central America
Flora of the Caribbean
Moraceae
Plants described in 1768
Taxa named by Philip Miller
Flora without expected TNC conservation status